Lackner is a surname. Notable people with the surname include:

Erich Lackner (1913–1992), German engineer
Franz Lackner (born 1956), Austrian prelate
Henry George Lackner (1851–1925), Canadian politician
Klaus Lackner, American physicist
Lisa Lackner (born 1982), Austrian racing cyclist
Rich Lackner (born 1956), American football coach

See also
Lachner (surname)